Kent E. Pullen (May 4, 1942 – April 14, 2003) was a Washington state politician in the Republican party.

Pullen held political office for over 30 years. In 1972 he was elected to the Washington House of Representatives. In 1974 he was elected to the Washington State Senate representing the 47th District, and re-elected in 1978, 1982, and 1986. In 1989 he was elected to the King County Council representing the 9th Council District, and re-elected in 1993, 1997, and 2001.

Pullen supported labor, small government, low taxes, private property rights, victims of crime, and natural medicine. He assisted in establishing the King County Natural Medicine Clinic in Kent, Washington, the first government-subsidized natural medicine clinic in the United States. He especially supported gun rights, and had the nickname of "pistol-packin' Pullen".

In 1967, Pullen graduated from the University of Washington with a Ph.D. in Chemistry. When the state legislature was not in session he worked at Boeing, and was a former councilman in the Society of Professional Engineering Employees in Aerospace (SPEEA). Pullen was an avid chess player, and tied for first place in the 1985 Washington State Chess Championship.

Pullen was married for 39 years, and is survived by his wife Fay and two children, Kathy and Walter. After his death, the King County Regional Communication and Emergency Coordination Center (RCECC) was named after him.

References

External links

Republican Party members of the Washington House of Representatives
Republican Party Washington (state) state senators
King County Councillors
Boeing people
University of Washington alumni
1942 births
2003 deaths
20th-century American politicians